Mark Anthony George Nelson (born 24 September 1986) is an English cricket player who has represented Northamptonshire.  He is a left-handed batsman who bowls right-arm medium pace.

He previously played for England in the 2006 U-19 Cricket World Cup in Sri Lanka, having previously playing at under 16's and 17's cricket for the side.

Nelson was released by the county at the end of the 2009 season.

References

External links

1986 births
Living people
English cricketers
Northamptonshire cricketers
Bedfordshire cricketers
People educated at Stowe School
People from Milton Keynes
English cricketers of the 21st century
Cricketers from Buckinghamshire